The MSGSU Istanbul Museum Of Painting And Sculpture is a museum of the Mimar Sinan Fine Arts University at the Galataport complex in the Karaköy neighborhood of Beyoğlu district, Istanbul, Turkey. It is 17,700 sqm in size and is housed in a converted shipping warehouse. Sedad Hakkı Eldem of Emre Arolat Architecture executed the conversion and museum's design.

References

Museums in Istanbul
Beyoğlu